Omoglymmius malaicus is a species of beetle in the subfamily Rhysodidae. It was described by Arrow in 1901.

References

malaicus
Beetles described in 1901